Land Without Music is a 1936 British comedy film directed by Walter Forde and starring Richard Tauber, Diana Napier and Jimmy Durante. It was made at Denham Studios. The film was one of a number of operetta films made in Britain during the decade.

The film is also known by the alternative title Forbidden Music in the United States.

Plot summary 
After discovering that her state is penniless because its citizens spend their time making music instead of money, a European Grand Duchess bans music in her domains. A New York journalist conspires with rogues to stage a concert.

Cast 
Richard Tauber as Mario Carlini
Diana Napier as Princess-Regent Maria Renata
Jimmy Durante as Jonah J. Whistler
June Clyde as Sadie Whistler
Derrick De Marney as Rudolpho Strozzi
George Hayes as Police Colonel Strozzi
Esme Percy as Austrian Ambassador
John Hepworth as Pedro
Edward Rigby as The Maestro
George Carney as Prison Warder
Ivan Wilmot as Chief Bandit
Robert Nainby as Minister for War
Joe Monkhouse as Finance Minister
Quentin McPhearson as Customs Officer
Evelyn Ankers as a Lady of the Court (uncredited; "Who's Carlini?" sequence)

Soundtrack 
The musical score for this film was composed by Oscar Straus. The main songs are 'Simple Little Melody', 'Smile for Me', 'Heaven in a Song' and 'You must have Music', all of which were recorded by Tauber for Parlophone.

References

Bibliography
Low, Rachael. Filmmaking in 1930s Britain. George Allen & Unwin, 1985.
Wood, Linda. British Films, 1927–1939. British Film Institute, 1986.

External links 

1936 films
1930s historical comedy films
1936 musical comedy films
British historical comedy films
British musical comedy films
British black-and-white films
Films directed by Walter Forde
Films set in the 19th century
Films set in Europe
Films shot at Denham Film Studios
Operetta films
Films scored by Oscar Straus
British historical musical films
1930s historical musical films
1930s English-language films
1930s British films